Frazer Township is a township in Allegheny County, Pennsylvania, United States. The population was 1,164 at the 2020 census. The Pittsburgh Mills shopping mall complex is located in the township.

Organized in 1914, Frazer Township was named for Robert S. Frazer, a state politician.

Geography

Surrounding neighborhoods
Frazer Township has seven borders, including Fawn Township from the north to the east, Tarentum and East Deer Township to the southeast, Springdale Township to the south, Harmar Township to the southwest, and Indiana and West Deer Townships to the west.

Government and Politics

Demographics

As of the census of 2000, there were 1,286 people, 527 households, and 383 families living in the township.  The population density was 137.2 people per square mile (53.0/km).  There were 569 housing units at an average density of 60.7/sq mi (23.4/km).  The racial makeup of the township was 99.53% White, 0.08% African American, 0.16% Asian, 0.08% from other races, and 0.16% from two or more races. Hispanic or Latino of any race were 0.08% of the population.

There were 527 households, out of which 23.9% had children under the age of 18 living with them, 63.2% were married couples living together, 6.1% had a female householder with no husband present, and 27.3% were non-families. 23.9% of all households were made up of individuals, and 9.7% had someone living alone who was 65 years of age or older.  The average household size was 2.44 and the average family size was 2.88.

In the township the population was spread out, with 19.0% under the age of 18, 6.5% from 18 to 24, 27.0% from 25 to 44, 26.7% from 45 to 64, and 20.9% who were 65 years of age or older.  The median age was 44 years. For every 100 females, there were 101.6 males.  For every 100 females age 18 and over, there were 98.5 males.

The median income for a household in the township was $40,515, and the median income for a family was $47,763. Males had a median income of $38,500 versus $24,643 for females. The per capita income for the township was $18,937.  About 4.6% of families and 6.5% of the population were below the poverty line, including 14.5% of those under age 18 and 3.3% of those age 65 or over.

Notable location
Tiger Ranch Cat Sanctuary

References

Pittsburgh metropolitan area
Townships in Allegheny County, Pennsylvania
Townships in Pennsylvania